Damon Peter Searle (born 26 October 1971) is a Welsh professional footballer. He is a left-sided defender, midfielder and coach, currently at Barry Town United.

Career

Searle began his career as a trainee at his home town club Cardiff City. It was here that he spent the major part of his career before leaving on a free transfer to sign for Stockport County. In the following years he left Stockport and played for Carlisle United, during which time he had a short loan spell at Rochdale, before moving to Southend United as a replacement for, the previous seasons player of the year, Nathan Jones. He appeared in the famous Jimmy Glass game against Plymouth Argyle, in which the goalkeeper scored in the 94th minute to keep Carlisle United in the Football League. He was released by Southend in the summer of 2003 and was signed on a month by month deal by Chesterfield as short term cover for several of their injured players but he was soon released by the club.

He spent the rest of his career in the lower leagues with Forest Green Rovers before moving back to his home country by signing for Newport County and captained the side on several occasions. During his time at Newport they twice narrowly missed out on the promotion play-offs and twice appeared in the FAW Premier Cup final, winning the 2008 final. Searle was released by Newport at the end of the 2007–08 season and went on to sign for Carmarthen Town.

In February 2009 Searle left Carmarthen and signed for his home town club Barry Town. However, he left the club at the end of the season and joined Haverfordwest County where he remained until January 2010.

Searle is also currently on the coaching staff of local Barry Team Cadoxton Imps. He also works with the Cardiff City Premier Club and Commercial Departments. Later on he would return to Barry Town alongside manager and friend Gavin Chesterfield as an assistant manager.

International career

Searle is a former Wales under-21 international.

Honours
Cardiff City
Third Division: 1992–93

Welsh Cup: 1991–92, 1992–93; runner up: 1993–94, 1994–95

Individual
PFA Team of the Year: 1992–93 Third Division

References

External links

Welsh Premier profile

1971 births
Living people
Welsh footballers
Footballers from Cardiff
Cardiff City F.C. players
Stockport County F.C. players
Carlisle United F.C. players
Rochdale A.F.C. players
Southend United F.C. players
Chesterfield F.C. players
Newport County A.F.C. players
Forest Green Rovers F.C. players
Hornchurch F.C. players
Carmarthen Town A.F.C. players
Barry Town United F.C. players
Wales under-21 international footballers
English Football League players
Cymru Premier players
Association football midfielders
Association football defenders
Haverfordwest County A.F.C. players